Dystheism (from Greek δυσ- dys-, "bad" and θεός theos, "god") is the belief that a god is not wholly good and can even be considered evil. Definitions of the term somewhat vary, with one author defining it as "where God decides to become malevolent". The broad theme of dystheism has existed for millennia, as shown by trickster gods found in ethnic religions and by the view of other representations of what the various belief systems regard as the Supreme Being, such as the creator deity as conceived in Abrahamic religions, through a non-religious lens as angry, vengeful, smiting, and hypocritical. The modern concept dates back many decades, with the Victorian era figure Algernon Charles Swinburne writing in his work Anactoria about the ancient Greek poet Sappho and her lover Anactoria in explicitly dystheistic imagery that includes cannibalism and sadomasochism.

Background and details
The concept has been used frequently in popular culture and is a part of several religious traditions in the world. Trickster gods found in ethnic religions often have a dystheistic nature. One example is Eshu, a trickster god from Yoruba mythology who deliberately fostered violence between groups of people for his own amusement, saying that "causing strife is my greatest joy." Another example is the Norse Loki, though Odin has these qualities as well. Zoroastrianism involves belief in an ongoing struggle between a creator god of goodness (Ahura Mazda) and a destroying god of hatred (Angra Mainyu), neither of which is omnipotent, which is a form of dualistic cosmology. The ancient Greek god Ares, depending on time and region, was associated with all the horrors of war.

Dystheists may themselves be theists or atheists, and in the case of either, concerning the nature of the Abrahamic god, will assert that God is not good, and is possibly, although not necessarily, malevolent, particularly (but not exclusively) to those who do not wish to follow any of the Abrahamic religions. For example, in his Sinners in the Hands of an Angry God (1741), the revivalist Christian preacher Jonathan Edwards describes a God full of vengeful rage and contempt. However, Edwards' theology presumes a God whose vengeance and contempt are directed toward evil and its manifestation in fallen humanity. To Edwards, a deity that ignores moral corruption or shows indifference to evil would be closer to the deity espoused by dystheism, that is, evil, because justice is an extension of love and moral goodness.

One particular view of dystheism, an atheistic approach, is summarized by the prominent revolutionary philosopher Mikhail Bakunin, who wrote in God and the State that "if God really existed, it would be necessary to abolish him". Bakunin argued that, as a "jealous lover of human liberty, and deeming it the absolute condition of all that we admire and respect in humanity", the "idea of God" constitutes metaphysical oppression of the idea of human choice. This argument is an inversion of Voltaire's phrase "If God did not exist, it would be necessary for man to invent Him".

Political theorist and activist Thomas Paine similarly wrote in The Age of Reason, "Whenever we read the obscene stories, the voluptuous debaucheries, the cruel and torturous executions, the unrelenting vindictiveness, with which more than half the Bible is filled, it would be more consistent that we called it the word of a demon, than the word of God." He added, "It is a history of wickedness, that has served to corrupt and brutalize mankind; and, for my part, I sincerely detest it, as I detest everything that is cruel." Unlike Bakunin, however, Paine's condemnation of the purported nature of the divine from his time did not extend to outright atheism and disbelief in all spirituality: Paine stated that he accepted the deistic notion of an almighty mover behind all things.

Usage in popular culture
Dystheism as a concept, although often not labeled as such, has been referred to in many aspects of popular culture. As stated before, related ideas date back many decades, with the Victorian era figure Algernon Charles Swinburne writing in his work Anactoria about the ancient Greek poet Sappho and her lover Anactoria in explicitly dystheistic imagery that includes cannibalism and sadomasochism. More recent examples include the popular Star Trek television series. Fictional character Worf claims that his race, the Klingons, have no gods, because they killed them centuries ago for being "more trouble than they were worth." Various music bands approached themes related to or directly touching dystheism; for example, thrash metal band Slayer condensed it in the album God Hates Us All, while melodic death metal band At the Gates explored it in various works such as Terminal Spirit Disease, The Nightmare of Being or Slaughter of the Soul.

See also

 Argument from morality
 Atenism
 Comparative religion
 Conceptions of God
 Creationism
 Demiurge
 Deus absconditus
 Deus otiosus
 Ethical monotheism
 Evil God Challenge
 False god
 Gnosticism
 God and the State
 God in Abrahamic religions
 Holocaust theology
 Malevolent God
 Misotheism
 Moralistic therapeutic deism
 Names of God
 Outline of theology
 Problem of evil
 Problem of Hell
 Religion in pre-Islamic Arabia
 Satanic Verses
 Theistic Satanism
 Theodicy
 Urmonotheismus (primitive monotheism)
 Violence in the Bible
 Violence in the Quran

References

Conceptions of God
Theism
Theodicy